HLA-DR6 (DR6) is a broad-antigen serotype that is further split into HLA-DR13 and HLA-DR14 antigen serotypes.

Serology

DR6 serological reactivity is relatively poor compared to other serological tests for DR antigens. Compare to DQ2 or DR7.

Disease associations
DR13 and DR14 share a common association to myasthenia gravis.

Allele groups
HLA-DRB1*13 and HLA-DRB1*14 encode serotypes of DR6.

References

6